Cage Hill is a conical hill in Sussex County, New Jersey. It is part of the New York–New Jersey Highlands of the Appalachian Mountains.

References 

Landforms of Sussex County, New Jersey
Hills of New Jersey